Tawlliqucha (Quechua tawlli a kind of legume, qucha lake, lagoon, hispanicized spelling Taulicocha) is a lake in Peru located in the Huánuco Region, Lauricocha Province, Cauri District. It lies southeast of the larger lake named Lawriqucha, near the village of Tawlliqucha (Taulicocha).

References 

Lakes of Peru
Lakes of Huánuco Region